"Whiskey Glasses" is a song written by Ben Burgess and Kevin Kadish, and recorded by American country music singer Morgan Wallen. It was first included on his 2016 EP The Way I Talk, and was released as the third single from his 2018 studio album, If I Know Me.

Background
The song was written by Kevin Kadish and Ben Burgess in 2015. Burgess had an idea about writing a song about whiskey glasses in a song-writing session with Kadish, who like the idea, and came up with the line "I'mma need some whiskey glasses, 'cause I don't wanna see the truth". They decided that the theme should be about someone who turned to drink because of a bad break-up. Burgess then remembered his father who used to say after he had too much to drink: "Poor Pappy ... oh, pour your Pappy a drink", which became the start of the song as "Poor me, pour me another drink".

The song was pitched to Wallen who then recorded the song with producer Joey Moi. It was first released in the summer of 2018, but only became a hit in 2019.

Commercial performance
"Whiskey Glasses" reached No. 1 on Billboard Country Airplay chart dated June 8, 2019, after topping the Hot Country Songs chart. The song was certified 3× Platinum by the RIAA on May 8, 2020. It has sold 391,000 copies in the United States as of March 2020.

Music video
The music video for "Whiskey Glasses" was directed by Justin Clough and premiered in October 2018. In it, Wallen is shown trying to mend his broken heart with drinking after his girlfriend dumps him, before eventually migrating to a bar with his friends (including Hardy) and giving a live performance of the song.

Charts

Weekly charts

Year-end charts

Decade-end charts

Certifications

References

2018 singles
Morgan Wallen songs
Song recordings produced by Joey Moi
Big Loud singles
Songs written by Kevin Kadish
Songs about alcohol
Billboard Hot Country Songs number-one singles of the year
Billboard Country Airplay number-one singles of the year